Elvis Sings The Wonderful World of Christmas is the fifteenth studio album by American singer Elvis Presley, released in October 1971. It was his first Christmas album with new recordings since Elvis' Christmas Album (1957). The album's single, "Merry Christmas Baby" / "O Come All Ye Faithful", was later released in November 1971. This album was a top seller and topped the Billboard Holiday Albums Chart, and would have charted high on the Billboard 200 but from 1963 to 1973, holiday albums were not allowed to chart. It did not have the commercial appeal of Elvis' first Christmas album, but over the years, it has become a perennial favorite. It was certified Gold on November 4, 1977, Platinum on December 1, 1977, 2× Platinum on May 20, 1988, and 3× Platinum on July 15, 1999, by the RIAA.

Several of the songs on the album were published by Elvis Presley's publishing company, such as "Holly Leaves and Christmas Trees", "I'll Be Home on Christmas Day", "If I Get Home on Christmas Day", and "On a Snowy Christmas Night". Presley is accompanied on most of the songs by The Imperials Quartet.

RCA reissued the album on compact disc in 1988. The CD release includes an extended version of "Merry Christmas Baby" and  "Blue Christmas", which was recorded on June 27, 1968, as a bonus track. This version had been previously released on the 1968 album, Elvis.

Track listing

Original release

Follow That Dream re-issue

Personnel 

Elvis Presley – lead vocals
David Briggs – piano
James Burton – lead guitar
Kenneth Buttrey – drums (tracks A1-A5, B1)
Jerry Carrigan – drums (tracks A6, B2-B5)
Gene Estes – marimba (tracks A3, B3, B5)
Eddie Hinton – overdubbed lead guitar on "Merry Christmas Baby"
Charlie Hodge – rhythm guitar
Millie Kirkham – backing vocals (tracks A2-A3, A5-A6, B2-B3, B5)
Larrie Londin – additional drums (track B1), additional percussion (A1, A3, B3)
Charlie McCoy – harmonica (tracks A1-B5), organ (A6, B2-B5), percussion (A6, B2-B5)
Farrell Morris – bells (track B5), additional percussion (B5)
Norbert Putnam – bass
Tommy Shepard – trombone (tracks A3, B3, B5)
Chip Young – rhythm guitar

The Imperials
Terry Blackwood – backing vocals (tracks A1-A3, A5-A6, B2-B3, B5)
Joe Moscheo – backing vocals (tracks A1-A3, A5-A6, B2-B3, B5)
Jimmie Murray – backing vocals (tracks A1-A3, A5-A6, B2-B3, B5)
Armond Morales – backing vocals (tracks A1-A3, A5-A6, B2-B3, B5)
Greg Gordon – backing vocals (tracks A1-A3, A5-A6, B2-B3, B5)

Production and Arrangements
Felton Jarvis – producer
Al Pachucki – basic track(s) recording engineer (tracks A1-B5), overdubs recording engineer (organ on A1, background vocals on A2-A3, A5-A6, B2-B3, B5, guitar on B4, bell & percussion on B5)
Glen Spreen – brass arrangements (tracks A1, A5, B1-B2), string arrangements (A1, A3, A5-B3, B5), organ played by (tracks A1-A5, B1), organ overdubs (A1)
Sidney Sharp – string contractor (tracks A1, A3, A5-B3, B5), brass contractor (A1, A5, B1-B2)
Mickey Crofford – instrumental overdubs recording engineer (tracks A3, A6-B1, B3, B5)

Bonus Track Personnel
 Elvis Presley — lead vocals, electric rhythm/lead guitar
Scotty Moore – acoustic rhythm guitar
D. J. Fontana – percussion
Charlie Hodge – backing vocals, acoustic rhythm guitar
Alan Fortas – percussion
Lance LeGault – tambourine, possible backing vocals
Steve Binder – producer
Bones Howe – engineer

Certifications

References

External links

Elvis Presley albums
1971 Christmas albums
Christmas albums by American artists
Albums produced by Felton Jarvis
RCA Records Christmas albums
Covers albums
Pop Christmas albums